Thomas Billington may refer to:

Thomas Billington (executioner) (1872–1902), English executioner
Thomas Billington, better known as Dynamite Kid (1958–2018), English professional wrestler